Tillandsia aguascalientensis is a species of flowering plant in the genus Tillandsia. This species is endemic to Mexico.

Cultivars
 Tillandsia 'Montoro'

References

BSI Cultivar Registry Retrieved 11 October 2009

aguascalientensis
Flora of Mexico